Eddie Hocking (born 6 January 1970) is a former professional Australian rules footballer who played for the Adelaide Football Club in the Australian Football League (AFL).

Originally from Clare, South Australia, Hocking began training with  South Australian National Football League (SANFL) club Central District aged sixteen and within 12 months made his SANFL league debut. After a strong season with Central District in 1990, when he was runner-up in the Magarey Medal, Hocking was signed by Adelaide prior to its first season in the AFL. He came off the interchange bench in Adelaide's Round One, 1991 and played ten further games that year.

An Indigenous Australian, Hocking is the shortest ever footballer to have played for Adelaide. Hocking’s trademark was his ability to baulk the player on the mark when lining up for goal. The clever onballer would make out he was going to take the set shot, and then at the last minute dodge around his opponent, who by that point was mid-air, and run into an open goal. He remained on the Adelaide Crows list for 1992 however did not play a game. Hocking finished his SANFL career with the West Adelaide Football Club.

References

1970 births
Australian rules footballers from South Australia
Adelaide Football Club players
Central District Football Club players
West Adelaide Football Club players
Indigenous Australian players of Australian rules football
Living people